Canada Education Park (CEP) is located on the southside of Chilliwack at the former site of the Canadian army base called CFB Chilliwack. It is home to learning institutions including University of the Fraser Valley, Justice Institute of BC, and RCMP Pacific Region Training Centre.

University of the Fraser Valley 

The South Chilliwack Campus of the University of the Fraser Valley houses the Trades and Technology Centre, the Faculty of Health Sciences building and the Agriculture Centre of Excellence.

Trades and Technology Centre 

The Trades and Technology Centre opened in 2009 and offers the following programmes.

Degree

 Agriculture & horticulture
 Aircraft structures
 Architectural drafting
 Automotive service
 Autobody collision
 Carpentry
 Culinary arts

 Electrician
 Electronics
 Heavy duty equipment
 Hospitality
 Joinery
 Plumbing & piping
 Welding

Continuing education programmes
 Agriculture & horticulture
 Architecture
 Aviation
 Bicycle frame building
 Bicycle maintenance
 Building Service Worker
 Carpentry and Woodworking

 CFC Recovery Certification
 Commercial Vehicles
 Confined Space Awareness
 Construction Safety Coordinator
 Crane operator
 Culinary Arts
 Electrical Code
 Equine

 Fall Protection Awareness
 Forklift Truck Certification
 Hospitality
 Hydronic System Design
 Jewelry Silversmithing
 Laminate Floor Installation
 Motorcycle Training
 Pesticide Application

 Powerline technician
 Welding
 WHMIS
Apprenticeships
 Auto Service Technician
 Carpenter
 Electrician
 Professional Cook

Health Sciences Centre 

The facility features an atrium, science and computer labs, a fully equipped dental clinic, nursing stations, a library, a bookstore, a canteen, a black box theatre, a human performance lab that includes an EEG lab, environmental chamber, and teaching lab and a First Nations gathering place. Its classrooms have open-source geo-exchange, solar thermal and light harvesting. The building earned LEED Gold certification for green building design, construction, and sustainability. It opened in 2012.

Programmes offered include Bachelor of Kinesiology, Bachelor of Science in Nursing, Practical Nursing, Health Care Assistant, and Certified Dental Assisting program.

Agriculture Centre of Excellence 

Students at the Agriculture Centre of Excellence include those enrolled in the Bachelor of Agriculture and Business Administration in Agriculture Management programmes, as well as several specialized diploma and certificate programmes, including berry production, integrated pest management, and livestock production. The Agriculture Center of Excellence opened in 2012.

Justice Institute of British Columbia 

Justice Institute of British Columbia (JIBC) is focused on training professionals in the justice, public safety and social services fields. It was the first post-secondary institution to establish a campus at CEP. It is one of six JIBC campuses and it includes a 102-room student residence.

JIBC offers two four-year degree programmes, namely the Bachelor of Public Safety Administration and Bachelor of Emergency and Security Management Studies (online). It also offers diplomas and applied certificates, and professional workshops and training to paramedics, firefighters, sheriffs, corrections officers, probation officers, peace officers, family justice counsellors, mediators, law enforcement, emergency management and security professionals, Emergency Social Services volunteers and search and rescue volunteers.

RCMP Pacific Region Training Centre 

The Royal Canadian Mounted Police opened its Pacific Region Training Centre at CEP in 2001.

References

External links 

 JIBC Student Handbook 2013-14
 JIBC Chilliwack Campus
 UFV opens new building at Canada Education Park in Chilliwack
 Agriculture Center of Excellence

Universities and colleges in British Columbia
Education in Chilliwack
University of the Fraser Valley